Boman's Boy (Swedish: Bomans pojke) is a 1933 Swedish comedy film directed by Ivar Johansson and starring Bengt Djurberg, Birgit Tengroth and Sigurd Wallén. It was shot at the Råsunda Studios in Stockholm. The film's sets were designed by the art director Arne Åkermark.

Synopsis
An unemployed man falls in with a gang of smugglers.

Cast
 Bengt Djurberg as Gösta Boman
 Birgit Tengroth as 	Elsa Pihlkvist
 Sigurd Wallén as 	Petrus Pihlkvist
 Siegfried Fischer as 	Adolf Boman
 Signe Lundberg-Settergren as 	Mrs. Frida Boman
 Bellan Roos as 	Svea
 Julia Cæsar as 	Ottilia Pihlkvist
 Thor Modéen as 	Fabian Fredriksson
 Gustaf Lövås as Gottfried
 Tor Borong as 	Pekka Stenroos
 Harry Ahlin as 	Karlsson, smuggler 
 Gösta Alexandersson as Baker's apprentice 
 Ossian Brofeldt as 	Ottila's friend 
 Alice Carlsson as Elsa's friend
 Bertil Ehrenmark as 	Longshoreman 
 Eivor Engelbrektsson as 	Girl at bakery 
 Carl Ericson as 	August Carlsson 
 Anders Frithiof as Williamsson, factory owner 
 Disa Gillis as 	Elsa's friend 
 Karin Granberg as 	Elsa's friend 
 Richard Lindström as 	Customs officer 
 Georg Skarstedt as 	Smuggler 
 Carin Swensson as 	Elsa's friend 
 Harald Wehlnor as 	Smuggler 
 Helle Winther as 	Åke, Williamsson's son

References

Bibliography 
 Qvist, Per Olov & von Bagh, Peter. Guide to the Cinema of Sweden and Finland. Greenwood Publishing Group, 2000.

External links 
 

1933 films
Swedish comedy films
1933 comedy films
1930s Swedish-language films
Films directed by Ivar Johansson
Swedish black-and-white films
1930s Swedish films